Walter Boninsegni (27 July 1902 – 3 January 1991) was an Italian sports shooter. He competed at the 1932, 1936 and 1948 Summer Olympics.

References

External links
 

1902 births
1991 deaths
Italian male sport shooters
Olympic shooters of Italy
Shooters at the 1932 Summer Olympics
Shooters at the 1936 Summer Olympics
Shooters at the 1948 Summer Olympics
Sportspeople from Venice
People from Mestre-Carpenedo